Maurice Biraud (3 March 1922 – 24 December 1982) was a French film actor. He appeared in 90 films between 1951 and 1982. Biraud was born on 3 March 1922 in Paris. He married actress Françoise Soulié in 1956. He died on 24 December 1982 in Boulogne-Billancourt, Hauts-de-Seine.

Selected filmography

 Le roi des camelots (1951)
 Mr. Peek-a-Boo (1951) - Un collégue de Léon (uncredited)
 Une fille à croquer (1951)
 Jamais deux sans trois (1952)
 La marche (1952)
 The Red Head (1952)
 Le Plus Heureux des hommes (1952) - Le jeune avocat
 Wonderful Mentality (1953)
 The Slave (1953) - Le photographe
 His Father's Portrait (1953) - Didier
 Quay of Blondes (1954) - Laurent
 Mam'zelle Nitouche (1954) - Un réserviste (uncredited)
 Le Secret d'Hélène Marimon (1954)
 Poisson d'avril (1954) - Le vendeur du bazar
 Les deux font la paire (1954) - L'avocat
 Pas de coup dur pour Johnny (1955)
 L'Homme et l'Enfant (1956) - (uncredited)
 Trois jours à vivre (1957)
 Donnez-moi ma chance (1957) - Un employé de Gilbert
 Charmants garçons (1957) - Récitant / Commentator (voice)
 It's All Adam's Fault (1958)
 First of May (1958) - Blanchot
 Pierrot la tendresse (1960) - Maternati
 Candide ou l'optimisme au XXe siècle (1960) - Le résident hollandais (uncredited)
 Taxi for Tobruk (1961) - François Gensac
 Le cave se rebiffe (1961) - Robert Mideau
 Le Petit Garçon de l'ascenseur (1962)
 The Seventh Juror (1962) - Veterinarian
 Le monte-charge (1962) - Adolphe Ferry
 Le Diable et les Dix Commandements (1962) - Louis (segment "Homicide point ne seras")
 The Eye of the Monocle (1962) - Martigue
 Pourquoi Paris ? (1962) - Denis, l'hôtelier
 Any Number Can Win (1963) - Louis Naudin
 La Soupe aux poulets (1963)
 Cherchez l'idole (1964) - Un invité au spectacle de Sylvie Vartan (uncredited)
 Des pissenlits par la racine (1964) - Jo Arengeot
 Une souris chez les hommes (1964) - Francis
 Les Aventures de Salavin (1964) - Louis Salavin
 La Métamorphose des cloportes (1965) - Arthur dit Le Mou
 La Grande Sauterelle (1967) - Alfred
 Fleur d'oseille (1967) - Commissaire Verdier
 Le Cri du cormoran le soir au-dessus des jonques (1971) - Le chauffeur de taxi
 La guerre des espions (1972) - Jérôme Nimo
 Five Leaf Clover (1972) - Georges-André Constant
 Elle cause plus... elle flingue (1972) - Herbert
 Le complot (1973) - Brunet
 Le Concierge (1973) - Martin Massoulier
 A Slightly Pregnant Man (1973) - Lamarie
 The Train (1973) - Maurice - le déserteur
 Le Permis de conduire (1974) - Le premier moniteur
 O.K. patron (1974) - Leroy
 La Rivale (1974) - Jean-Claude
 Salut les frangines (1975) - Monsieur Chotard
 Flic Story (1975) - Le patron de l'hôtel Saint-Appoline
 The Gypsy (1975) - Pierrot le naïf
 Jackpot (1975)
 Deux imbéciles heureux (1976) - Le docteur
 Bartleby (1976) - Dindon
 Gloria (1977) - Stéphane Perreau
 C'est dingue... mais on y va (1979) - Monsieur Castagnet
 La Bande du Rex (1980) - Le commissaire Raoul Fleury
 Pourquoi pas nous ? (1981) - M. Simon, le patron
 Beau-père (1981) - Le camionneur témoin de l'accident / Accident Witness (uncredited)
 Un dimanche de flic (1983) - Fred

References

External links

1922 births
1982 deaths
Male actors from Paris
French male film actors
20th-century French male actors